This is a discography of George Frideric Handel's opera Rinaldo, which premiered on 24 February 1711 at the Queen's Theatre in London.

Video recordings

References

Opera discographies
Operas by George Frideric Handel